Margaret Quimby (1904–1965) was an American stage and film actress.  She appeared in both lead and supporting roles during the silent and early sound era.

Filmography

 Fight and Win (1924)
 K.O. for Cupid (1924)
 One Glorious Scrap (1925)
 The Teaser (1925)
 Perils of the Wild (1925)
 What Happened to Jones (1926)
 The Radio Detective (1926)
 The Whole Town's Talking (1926)
 New York (1927)
 The Western Whirlwind (1927)
 Heads Up, Charley (1927)
 The World at Her Feet (1927)
 The Tired Business Man (1927)
 Us (1927)
 The Tragedy of Youth (1928)
 Sally of the Scandals (1928)
 Lucky Boy (1929)
 Two Men and a Maid (1929)
 The Rampant Age (1930)
 Trailing Trouble (1930)
 Ladies Love Brutes (1930)
 Men on Call (1931) (scenes deleted)

References

Bibliography
 Lussier, Tim. "Bare Knees" Flapper: The Life and Films of Virginia Lee Corbin. McFarland,  2018. 
 Pitts, Michael R. Poverty Row Studios, 1929–1940: An Illustrated History of 55 Independent Film Companies, with a Filmography for Each. McFarland & Company, 2005.

External links

1904 births
1965 deaths
American film actresses
American stage actresses
People from  Minneapolis